Microsoft Windows is a computer operating system developed by Microsoft. It was first launched in 1985 as a graphical operating system built on MS-DOS. The initial version was followed by several subsequent releases, and by the early 1990s, the Windows line had split into two separate lines of releases: Windows 9x for consumers and Windows NT for businesses and enterprises. In the following years, several further variants of Windows would be released: Windows CE in 1996 for embedded systems; Pocket PC in 2000 (renamed to Windows Mobile in 2003 and Windows Phone in 2010) for personal digital assistants and, later, smartphones; Windows Holographic in 2016 for AR/VR headsets; and several other editions.

Personal computer versions
A "personal computer" version of Windows is considered to be a version that end-users or OEMs can install on personal computers, including desktop computers, laptops, and workstations.

The first five versions of Windows–Windows 1.0, Windows 2.0, Windows 2.1, Windows 3.0, and Windows 3.1–were all based on MS-DOS, and were aimed at both consumers and businesses. However, Windows 3.1 had two separate successors, splitting the Windows line in two: the consumer-focused "Windows 9x" line, consisting of Windows 95, Windows 98, and Windows Me; and the professional Windows NT line, comprising Windows NT 3.1, Windows NT 3.5, Windows NT 3.51, Windows NT 4.0, and Windows 2000. These two lines were reunited into a single line with the NT-based Windows XP; this Windows release succeeded both Windows Me and Windows 2000 and had separate editions for consumer and professional use. Since Windows XP, multiple further versions of Windows have been released, the most recent of which is Windows 11.

Mobile versions

Mobile versions refer to versions of Windows that can run on smartphones or personal digital assistants.

Server versions

High-performance computing (HPC) servers

Windows Essential Business Server

Windows Home Server

Windows MultiPoint Server

Windows MultiPoint Server was an operating system based on Windows Server. It was succeeded by the MultiPoint Services role in Windows Server 2016 and Windows Server version 1709. It was no longer being developed in Windows Server version 1803 and later versions.

Windows Small Business Server

Device versions

ARM-based tablets

In 2012 and 2013, Microsoft released versions of Windows specially designed to run on ARM-based tablets; these versions of Windows were based on Windows 8 and Windows 8.1, respectively, although the standard versions could run on x86-based tablets without modification. Upon the release of Windows 10 in 2015, the ARM-specific version for large tablets was discontinued; large tablets (such as the Surface Pro 4) were only released with x86 processors and could run the full version of Windows 10. Windows 10 Mobile had the ability to be installed on smaller tablets (up to nine inches); however, very few such tablets were released, and Windows 10 Mobile primarily ended up only running on smartphones until its discontinuation. In 2017, the full version of Windows 10 gained the ability to run on ARM, which rendered a specific version of Windows for ARM-based tablets unnecessary.

Mixed reality and virtual reality headsets

Surface Hub

Microsoft originally announced the Surface Hub, an interactive whiteboard, in January 2015. The Surface Hub family of devices runs a custom variant of Windows 10 known as Windows 10 Team.

Windows XP-based tablets

Two versions of Windows XP were released that were optimized for tablets. Beginning with Windows Vista, all tablet-specific components were included in the main version of the operating system.

Embedded versions

Windows Embedded Compact

Windows Embedded Standard

Other embedded versions
Windows Embedded Industry
Windows Embedded Automotive

Cancelled versions

Cancelled personal computer versions

Cancelled mobile versions

Cancelled server versions

See also
List of Microsoft operating systems
Microsoft Windows version history
Windows 10 version history
Windows 11 version history
Comparison of Microsoft Windows versions
List of Microsoft codenames

Notes

References

Windows
Windows
History of Microsoft